The 41st Field Artillery Brigade ("Rail Gunners)" is a Field Artillery Brigade of the United States Army. Initially only operating from October to December of 1918, it has since operated as a Brigade level staff from 1921 to 1931, 1942–1944, 1952–1969, 1972–2005, 2007–2015, and 2018 to present. It has been stationed in Virginia, Hawaii, Oklahoma, Texas, and Germany. It has served in World War II, Vietnam, Operations Desert Shield & Desert Storm, Kosovo, and Operation Iraqi Freedom.

History
The 41st Fires Brigade traces its lineage back to the 41st Artillery Regiment (Coast Artillery Corps), a heavy artillery formation activated near the end of World War I.

The 41st Artillery was organized on 1 October 1918 at Fort Monroe, Virginia, and Archibald H. Sunderland was appointed as commander. On 22 December 1918 the unit was demobilized. On 15 January 1921, the colors were transferred to the Pacific Theater, where the 41st Artillery was reconstituted as the Hawaiian Railway Battalion. On 1 July 1924, the unit was redesignated as the 41st Coast Artillery and remained in Hawaii until its deactivation on 30 June 1931.

On 21 April 1942, the 41st Coast Artillery was re-activated, this time at Fort Hase, Hawaii, where it served until 25 May 1944. It was awarded the Asiatic Pacific Streamer for its role in World War II. At that time, it was retired from the rolls of the regular Army and incorporated into the Hawaiian Department.

On 28 June 1950, Headquarters Battery, 41st Coast Artillery was reconstituted as Headquarters and Headquarters Battery, 41st Field Artillery Group and was inactivated 18 January 1952 at Fort Sill, Oklahoma.

In April 1967, the 41st Field Artillery Group deployed to the Republic of Vietnam, where it earned nine campaign streamers. On 15 November 1969, the Group was inactivated and its colors returned to the United States.

On 15 March 1972, the 41st Field Artillery Group was re-activated in Babenhausen, West Germany. The unit was re-designated as the 41st Field Artillery Brigade on 16 June 1982, and was assigned to V Corps Artillery. In 1999 was deployed to Albania as part of Operation Task Force Hawk to potentially perform SEAD (Suppression of Enemy Air Defenses) missions, and to act as a command and control center for all artillery units involved in the operation.  In 2003, the brigade deployed with V Corps to Iraq in support of Operation Iraqi Freedom. Following their service in Iraq, the unit was inactivated on 15 July 2005. The 41st Fires Brigade was reactivated at Fort Hood, Texas on 16 April 2007 taking over the units of the inactivated 4th Fires Brigade.

Slightly more than one year later, the 41st Fires Brigade again deployed to the Wasit Province of Iraq where it provided security and stabilization to the people of Iraq for 14 months.

In 2014, the Army changed the name of the brigade back to 41st Field Artillery Brigade, and announced that they would change in the coming year to 1st Cavalry Division Artillery, taking up responsibility for all of the artillery assets within the division.

On 1 April 2015, 41st Field Artillery Brigade was inactivated and reflagged as the 1st Cavalry Division Artillery (United States).

On 30 November 2018, the 41st Field Artillery Brigade was re-activated at U.S. Army Garrison Bavaria, controlling the M270 Multiple Launch Rocket System-equipped 1st Battalion, 6th Field Artillery Regiment and 1st Battalion, 77th Field Artillery Regiment.

In September 2020 the 1st Battalion, 77th Field Artillery Regiment was reactivated with MLRS/HIMARS dual capability.

Structure
The 41st Field Artillery structure as of 2022 is as follows:

 41st Field Artillery Brigade, in Grafenwöhr, Germany
 Headquarters and Headquarters Battery
 1st Battalion, 6th Field Artillery Regiment (M270 MLRS)
 1st Battalion, 77th Field Artillery Regiment (M270 MLRS)
 589th Brigade Support Battalion
 232nd Signal Company

Commanders
Ranks indicated are the highest ranks held by the individual, not necessarily the rank held at time of command.

41st FA group
 Col. S.H. Wheeler, 1967
 Col. Archibald V. Arnold, 1969
 Col. Homer W. Kiefer, Jr., 1973–75
 Col. Charles Hoenstine, 1976–77
 Col. Kenneth R.Bailey
 Col. Edward J. Stein, Jr., Dec 1977 – July 1979

41st FA Brigade

41st Fires Brigade
 Col. Richard M. Francey, Jr., April 2007 – October 2009
 LTG John Thomson, III, Oct. 2009 – July 2011
 Col. William McRae, July 2011 – July 2014

41st Field Artillery Brigade
 Col. Patrick Gaydon, July 2014 – April 2015 (brigade inactivated)
Col. Seth Knazovich, October 2018 (brigade activated) – August 2020
Col. Daniel G. Miller, August 2020 - August 2022
Col. Wilbur W. Hsu, August 2022 - Present

Honors and decorations 
 Campaign participation credit

 Decorations

References

External links

 41st Fires Brigade Homepage
 41st Fires Brigade Flickr page
 Official Lineage & Honors
 

041|Field Artillery 041
Military units and formations established in 1918
Military units and formations disestablished in 2015
Military units and formations established in 2018
1918 establishments in Virginia
2015 disestablishments in Texas